Lorenzo Diamond (born December 15, 1979 in Biloxi, Mississippi) is a former American football tight end of the National Football League. He was signed by the Arizona Cardinals as an undrafted free agent in 2003. He played college football at Auburn.

Diamond also played for the Miami Dolphins.

He recorded 11 receptions in 21 career games.

1979 births
Living people
Sportspeople from Biloxi, Mississippi
American football tight ends
Biloxi High School alumni
Auburn Tigers football players
Arizona Cardinals players
Miami Dolphins players